Brachycorynus is a genus of fungus weevils in the beetle family Anthribidae. There are at least three described species in Brachycorynus.

Species
These three species belong to the genus Brachycorynus:
 Brachycorynus distentus (Frieser, 1983)
 Brachycorynus hirsutus Valentine, 1998
 Brachycorynus rectus (LeConte, 1876)

References

Further reading

 
 

Anthribidae
Articles created by Qbugbot